Wilgreen Lake is a  reservoir in Madison County, Kentucky. It was constructed in 1966.

References

Infrastructure completed in 1966
Reservoirs in Kentucky
Protected areas of Madison County, Kentucky
Bodies of water of Madison County, Kentucky